The Strand Moraines is an ancient lateral moraine of the Koettlitz Glacier, deposited at the outer edge of Bowers Piedmont Glacier on the west shore of McMurdo Sound, in Victoria Land. Discovered by the Discovery expedition (1901–04) and first called "The Eskers." The feature was renamed by Scott in keeping with its true nature.

Moraines of the Ross Dependency
Landforms of Victoria Land
Scott Coast
Geography of the Ross Dependency